EuroCommerce is the principal European organisation representing the retail and wholesale sector. It is led by Juan Manuel Morales, managing director of IFA.

It gathers members in about 30 countries: companies (global players such as Carrefour, Ikea, Metro and Tesco, as well as many small businesses) and federations of companies at a European or national level. 

EuroCommerce represents one in seven jobs (up to 26 million employees) in Europe. It supports millions of further jobs throughout the supply chain, from small local suppliers to international businesses. 

EuroCommerce is the recognised European social partner for the retail and wholesale sector.

History

EuroCommerce was founded in 1993, as a result of merging three pre-existing large retail chains, small retail operators and wholesalers and traders. It brings together European and national associations representing various aspects of retail and wholesale and international trade to form a single voice for the sector in Brussels. 

Its first president (from 1993 to 1994) and driving force behind the creation of EuroCommerce, was Dr Albert Heijn (1927–2011), the chairman of the major Dutch retailer Ahold.

Policy areas

EuroCommerce brings together the expertise of its members and secretariat to help inform and contribute to debate in a range of policies, including competitiveness and the economy, the digital economy, single market, global trade, environment and sustainability, social policy and industrial relations, food and non-food, enterprise and SMEs.

List of presidents

Members

The membership of EuroCommerce is composed of National Associations, Companies (founded in a European country or International companies with an HQ in Europe) and Affiliated Federations (whether they operate at a national or European level).

As of July 2021, the members are:

National Associations

Companies

Affiliated Federations

References

Business organizations based in Europe
Cross-European advocacy groups